City College Southampton is a general further education college located in Southampton, Hampshire, England.

The college has around 1000 full-time, 2500 part-time students and 450 apprentices each year.  It offers a wide choice of full-time vocational courses including art & design, beauty, hairdressing, media, hospitality and catering, IT, performing arts, construction, engineering, business studies, care, travel & tourism, childcare, marine technology, boat building and technical theatre.

The college teaches career-focused courses for young people and adults, both students and apprentices from 16 years old and further (no one is ever too old to learn).  There are courses at all levels to prepare students for work or university and to improve key life skills. These include HNDs and HNCs, Access to Higher Education, BTEC Extended Diplomas and many other types of vocational course to give students the qualifications they need.

The college trains apprentices. All of its apprentices are employed by a local business and train some of the time at college. Major local firms such as Griffon Hoverworks have high quality apprenticeship schemes.  It runs other training courses for businesses and other organisations such as the local hospitals and City Council.

Since September 2017 Solent University's Warsash Maritime School has been located at the campus.

Campuses
 St Mary Street Campus, the main campus is located near Southampton City Centre.
 Marine Technology Centre, Woolston

History (17th century-1995)

The oldest building on the site is Bencraft House, a fine Georgian house built in around 1800.  It is named after Russell Bencraft, an eminent Sotonian who was born in the house when his father was the medical officer for the workhouse.

The Victorian frontage dates back to the old St Mary workhouse (1866) is on the site of earlier almshouses which go back to the 17th century.

City College Southampton has its origins in wartime skill shortages and a recognition of the need to set up a technical school in Southampton. Operating from a number of locations; in 1948 the Education Authority took over the old St Mary Institution (or workhouse) to provide a more permanent home for the Technical School and following substantial building works and consolidation of a number of local school sites, it was opened as the Technical College in June 1952.

In 1960 work had begun on the construction of Southampton College of Technology and the Technical College became part of this organisation. In 1969, however, it became a separate entity and as such adopted the name Southampton Technical College.  
On 2 April 1995 it changed its name again to Southampton City College.

Redevelopment (2004–2011)
City College undertook an extensive campus redevelopment programme. The first stage was completed in September 2004, which included the completion of a new reception and information & advice centre, new teaching block with learning centres for IT, Art & Design, Health & Social Care and Childcare. The second phase was completed in the summer of 2005 and involved the development of a new technology building which includes facilities for motor vehicle, brickwork and construction trades. In September 2009 an outdated block was transformed to provide industry standard learning facilities for 3D creative design, engineering, professional construction and electrical installation. This block also houses learning centres and a lecture theatre.

In September 2010, with 85% of its buildings new or refurbished, City College opened two new blocks, forming the completion phase of the campus redevelopment project. 'The hub' includes a new theatre, TV and radio studios, a business training suite, a learning centre a theatre bar and fitness suite. The conjoined Aspire building houses new facilities for catering, hair and beauty, together with seminar rooms and learning centres.

These work-based training facilities are open to the public as the "Aspire" restaurant and "Kudos" Hair and Beauty Salons, and form an integral part in the education provided in these service-related industries.

The hub

The college's £34 million third phase development of the site provides a commercial and community resource. These new facilities known as 'the hub' can be used by learners of all ages, the local community and local businesses.

eLearning
City College provides a number of electronic systems to support students in their learning.
A virtual learning environment (VLE) branded as Citybit based on Moodle software is available to all students from inside and outside the college.
A streaming media service branded as Citytube is also available. Very much like "YouTube", students can upload videos as well as view learning content produced or supplied by teachers to support their learning.

In 2011 City College's eLearning systems featured prominently in the OFSTED best practice guide. ofsted virtual learning environments e-portfolio
ofsted good practice case studies booklet pdf

In 2012 City College Southampton was shortlisted for a Times Educational Supplement (TES) FE award in elearning for the work done in Citybit, the VLE.

Notable alumni
- Paul Ainsworth Chef, restaurant and hotel owner

- Craig David - Singer and musician

- Mark Tilling - Chocolatier and winner of Bake Off Creme de la Creme

References

External links

 Southampton City College
 Ofsted Report Mar 2011
 The Hub Theater

Further education colleges in Hampshire
Education in Southampton
Educational institutions established in 1952
1952 establishments in England